The Christie-Parsels House is located in Tenafly, Bergen County, New Jersey, United States. The house was built in 1804 by William P. Christie. In 1836 Samuel Parsels erected a large wing on the eastern side of the original house. The house was added to the National Register of Historic Places on January 10, 1983.

See also 

 National Register of Historic Places listings in Bergen County, New Jersey

References

Houses on the National Register of Historic Places in New Jersey
Houses in Bergen County, New Jersey
National Register of Historic Places in Bergen County, New Jersey
Tenafly, New Jersey
New Jersey Register of Historic Places